Jackanory is a BBC children's television series which was originally broadcast between 1965 and 1996. It was designed to stimulate an interest in reading. The show was first transmitted on 13 December 1965, and the first story was the fairy-tale "Cap-o'-Rushes" read by Lee Montague. Jackanory continued to be broadcast until 1996, with around 3,500 episodes in its 30-year run. The final story, The House at Pooh Corner by A. A. Milne, was read by Alan Bennett and broadcast on 24 March 1996. The show was briefly revived on 27 November 2006 for two one-off stories, and the format was revived as Jackanory Junior on CBeebies between 2007 and 2009.

The show's format, which varied little over the decades, involved an actor reading from children's novels or folk tales, usually while seated in an armchair. From time to time the scene being read would be illustrated by a specially commissioned still drawing, often by Quentin Blake. In 1983, Malou Bonicos was commissioned to provide illustrations for one Jackanory story. Usually a single book would occupy five daily fifteen-minute episodes, from Monday to Friday.

A spin-off series was Jackanory Playhouse (1972–85), which was a series of thirty-minute dramatisations. These included a dramatisation by Philip Glassborow of the comical A. A. Milne story "The Princess Who Couldn't Laugh".

Coverage of the live broadcast of the Apollo 8 mission in 1968 was interrupted so Jackanory could be shown.

Title
The show's title comes from an old English nursery rhyme:

The rhyme was first recorded in the publication The Top Book of All, for little Masters and Misses, which appeared about 1760.

Revival

In November 2006 Jackanory briefly returned with comedian John Sessions as the revived programme's first narrator reading the Lord of the Rings parody Muddle Earth, written by Paul Stewart (and illustrator Chris Riddell). The second narrator was Sir Ben Kingsley, reading The Magician of Samarkand by Alan Temperley. They were broadcast in three 15-minute slots on CBBC and BBC One and later repeated in their entirety on BBC One on consecutive Sundays. The readings of Muddle Earth were heavily accompanied by animation and featured John Sessions speaking the lines of all the animated characters (and occasionally reading those of Joe whenever he was not on-screen), leading to criticism that the spirit of the original programme, a single voice telling a tale with minimal distractions, had been lost. (The original series had occasionally included dramatised material, in e.g. 1984's Starstormers by Nicholas Fisk, and increasingly so towards the end of its run in the mid-1990s.) The Magician of Samarkand was a similar production, albeit without the actors speaking additional lines; Ben Kingsley read both the story and the lines of all the characters. Both of these stories were produced and directed by Nick Willing.

Both stories were released in their entirety on DVD later that year, with added bonus features (galleries with images from the stories and a behind-the-scenes film for Muddle Earth).

While no further stories were made, Muddle Earth would be adapted for television again a few years later.

Jackanory Junior
A version of Jackanory for younger children—called Jackanory Junior—was shown on CBeebies between 2007 and 2009. The CBeebies Bedtime Stories strand continues the tradition of well-known actors and personalities reading stories directly to camera.

Stories

See List of Jackanory episodes for the stories broadcast from 13 December 1965 to 9 March 1984.

Subsequent stories included:

 The Lightkeepers (1983), read by Andrew Burt
The Dangerous Journey (1983), read by Andrew Burt
The Wheel on the School, written by Meindert DeJong, read by Peter Settelen
Arabel's Tree House, written by Joan Aiken, read by Bernard Cribbins
The Hundred and One Dalmatians, written by Dodie Smith, read by Sarah Greene
Matilda, written by Roald Dahl, read by Victoria Wood

List of readers

Joss Ackland (5 programmes reading Danny, the Champion of the World)
Tom Baker
Floella Benjamin
Alan Bennett
George Benson
Ed Bishop
James Bolam
Helena Bonham Carter (5 programmes reading Philippa Pearce's The Way to Sattin Shore stories)
Richard Briers
Kathy Burke
Andrew Burt
Earl Cameron
Brian Cant
Prince Charles (reading his own book; The Old Man of Lochnagar)
Matthew Corbett
Bernard Cribbins (114 programmes)
Peter Davison
Angus Deayton 
Judi Dench
Denholm Elliott
Rupert Everett
Harry Fowler
Edward Fox
Jan Francis
Clement Freud
Ann George
John Grant (55 programmes reading his Littlenose stories)
Joyce Grenfell
Sheila Hancock
Susanne Hart
Lenny Henry
John Hurt
Wendy Hiller
Michael Hordern
Jeremy Irons
Martin Jarvis
Stratford Johns
James Robertson Justice
Penelope Keith
Ben Kingsley (The Magician of Samarkand)
Roy Kinnear
Rosalind Knight
Arthur Lowe
Joanna Lumley
Sylvester McCoy
Geraldine McEwan
Paul McGann
Ian McKellen
Art Malik
Alfred Marks
Alex Marshall (1969–1974)
Trevor Martin
Rik Mayall (reading George's Marvellous Medicine)
George Melly
Paul Merton
Spike Milligan
Hayley Mills
Lee Montague
Patrick Moore
Liam Neeson
Michael Palin
Jon Pertwee
Alison Prince
Ted Ray
Miranda Richardson
Alan Rickman
Bob Roberts
Tony Robinson
Gordon Rollings
Patsy Rowlands
Willie Rushton
Margaret Rutherford
Prunella Scales
John Sessions 
Elaine Smith
Maggie Smith
Patrick Stewart
John Stride
Elaine Stritch
Mollie Sugden
H. E. Todd
Patrick Troughton
Ann Way
Mary Webster
Billie Whitelaw
Kenneth Williams (69 programmes)
Victoria Wood (reading the Ten in a Bed story and Matilda by Roald Dahl)
Wendy Wood (Auntie Gwen)

Cultural influence

Philip Glenister, in character as Gene Hunt, made an appearance on Jackanory as the guest reader in the Ashes to Ashes series 2 finale, set in 1982, which Alex Drake (Keeley Hawes) imagines being transmitted to her television set.

"Jackanory, jackanory" said by someone in the sing-song tones of the theme tune indicates that they think that someone else is making up or "stretching" a story, i.e. lying.

In 2013 the UK TV Network Dave launched Crackanory as an adult version of Jackanory.  Each Crackanory episode features two 15-minute tales narrated by contemporary comedians and actors, containing a mix of live-action and animation as per the original.

References

External links
 British Film Institute Screen Online analysis and listings (incomplete)
 
 Stop Messin' About: The Kenneth Williams Website via archive.org
 New Chapter Opening for Jackanory: BBC News report
 Jackanory at bbc.co.uk
 The new Jackanory at CBBC

CBeebies
1965 British television series debuts
1996 British television series endings
1960s British children's television series
1970s British children's television series
1980s British children's television series
1990s British children's television series
1960s British anthology television series
1970s British anthology television series
1980s British anthology television series
1990s British anthology television series
British children's fantasy television series
BBC children's television shows
Television series by BBC Studios
Lost BBC episodes
English-language television shows
2000s British children's television series
Storytelling television shows
British television series revived after cancellation